This was the first edition of the tournament, Guillermo Durán and Máximo González won the title beating Andrej Martin and Hans Podlipnik in the final 7–6(8–6), 7–5.

Seeds

Draw

References
 Main Draw

Santiago Challenger - Doubles